Maximiliano Hurtado Roco (born 1984) is a Chilean lawyer who was elected as a member of the Chilean Constitutional Convention.

See also
 List of members of the Chilean Constitutional Convention

References

External links
 
 BCN Profile

Living people
1984 births
21st-century Chilean politicians
University of Atacama alumni
Members of the Chilean Constitutional Convention